The Coopers' Dance is a guild dance of coopers originally started in Münich. Since early 1800s the custom spread via journeymen and it is now a common tradition over the Old Bavaria region. The dance was supposed to be held every seven years.

History
However, for a long time the date 1517 was prevalent in the literature, following the 1830 book  by Anton Baumgartner (1761–1831), who originated the discredited legend that the tradition started after the 1517 plague, to revive the spirits of the people, "to lure them out of their houses", although other authors tried to suggest other dates. But there are no records in chronicles about any plague in Münich at this period of time. Still, the 500th anniversary was celebrated in 2017.

There is no clear indication of the origin of the seven-year cycle.

Dance and music

The choreography of the dance was standardized in the 19th century.

After marching in various formations and performing standard figures, the final number is the barrel hoop swinging. The hoop swinger holds two hoops with shots of schnapps on the inside. The idea is to swing the hoops in intricate ways without spilling the schnapps (relying on the centrifugal force).

Of other traditions of the dance, only the costume survived: white shirt, white waistcoat, red jacket, leather apron, knee breeches, sash, brogue shoes and, a green cap adorned with down feathers 

The author of the current standard tune (the so-called the Second or New Münich , 1866) is Johann Wilhelm Siebenkäs (1826-1888).

References

Dance festivals in Germany
Events in Munich
German traditions
Culture in Munich